WOCS may refer to:

 WOCS-LP, a low-power radio station (93.7 FM) serving Orangeburg, South Carolina
 WEBF, a radio station (88.3 FM) licensed to serve Lerose, Kentucky, United States, which held the call sign WOCS from 2001 to 2011
 Warrant Officer Candidate School